Hákun Djurhuus (11 December 1908 – 22 September 1987) was the prime minister of the Faroe Islands from 1963 to 1967. He was born in Tórshavn.

He was first elected to the Løgting in 1946 and was its speaker 1950–1951. He was member of the town council of Klaksvík from 1946 to 1951, mayor of Klaksvík from 1950 to 1951. He was chairman of the Peoples Party (Fólkaflokkurin) from 1951 to 1980.

He was minister from 1951 to 1954 and Prime Minister from 1963 to 1967. He was member of the Folketing, elected as one of two Faroese members in the periods 1957–1960 and 1968–1973.

Djurhuus withdrew from politics after the 1980 elections.

He died on 22 September 1987.

External links 
 Fólkaflokkurin 

1908 births
1987 deaths
Prime Ministers of the Faroe Islands
People's Party (Faroe Islands) politicians
Speakers of the Løgting
People from Tórshavn
Faroese members of the Folketing